Hot Cars & Spent Contraceptives is the first full-length album by Norwegian band Turbonegro. It was released in March 1992 through Big Ball Records. Only 1,000 copies were released originally in Norway. A different version with five extra tracks of the record was released on early 1993 in Germany by Repulsion Records, titled Helta Skelta with a painted portrait of Sirhan Sirhan on the cover (several people have mistaken it for Charles Manson) and a 20-plus minute audio-play about a young man being raped by a policeman called "A Career in Indierock". This version left out the song "Prima Moffe". Only 1,500 copies were made of this version. When Bitzcore Records started to re-release the earlier Turbonegro records the album was remastered and came with a new artwork by Dimitri 'from Oslo' Kayiambakis. It was released in June 2000 titled Hot Cars and Spent Contraceptives, it contained all the tracks from the original version and had the same bonus tracks as Helta Skelta.

Music and lyrics
The album gives an early introduction to the deathpunk sound, Turbonegro's very own self proclaimed genre; dark death driven punk rock with occasional excursions into hardcore and metal as well as a certain tendency for disruptive and sarcastic lyrics.

Releases
The album was also released on 12" vinyl in Germany with green and black splatters and in the United States through Get Hip Records and in doing so their editions were almost always different in one way or another, mainly in colored wax. This strictly 'limited American only pressing' for GHR was on golden and black marbled wax.

Track listing
"Librium Love" – 5:17
"Armed and Fairly Well-Equipped" (bonus) – 4:04
"Suburban Anti-Christ" (bonus) – 1:59
"Punk Pals" – 2:32
"Kiss the Knife (a.k.a. 'Hand of Love')" – 1:58 (The song's opening phrase "hello sailor" is sampled from Peter Sellers in the movie "Casino Royale")
"Vaya Con Satan" – 4:02
"I'm in Love with the Destructive Girls" – 2:12
"Hot Cars" – 3:34
"Clenched Teeth" – 2:21
"Manimal" (bonus) – 4:15
"Dark Secret Girl" (bonus) – 2:00
"New Wave Song" – 2:40
"Nadsat Comes Easy" – 4:31
"Zonked Out (on Hashish)" – 2:03
"Prima Moffe" – 10:32
"A Career in Indierock" (bonus) – 24:36

Helta Skelta track listing
"Librium Love" – 5:17
"Suburban Anti-Christ" (bonus) – 1:59
"Armed and Fairly Well Equipped" (bonus) – 4:04
"Vaya Con Satan" – 4:02
"Punk Pals" – 2:32
"New Wave Song" – 2:40
"Manimal" – 4:15
"Nadsat Comes Easy" – 4:31
"Dark Secret Girl" – 2:00
"Hot Cars" (bonus) – 3:34
"Clenched Teeth" (bonus) – 2:21
"Zonked Out (on Hashish)" – 2:03
"Kiss the Knife (aka 'Hand of Love')" – 1:58
"I'm in Love with the Destructive Girls" – 2:12
"A Career in Indierock" (bonus) – 24:36

Personnel
Harry Neger (Harald Fossberg) – vocals
Brune Neger (Rune Grønn) – guitar
Max Neger (Pål Bøttger Kjærnes) - guitar
Bingo Neger (Bengt Calmeyer) – bass
Bongo Neger (Thomas Seltzer) – drums

Happy-Tom played drums on this album. He presently plays bass guitar with the band.

References

1992 debut albums
Turbonegro albums